Sıtkı Ferdi İmdat (born 5 October 2001) is a Turkish professional footballer who plays as a forward for Ankaragücü.

Career
İmdat is a youth product of Ankaragücü. He made his professional debut with Ankaragücü in a 1-0 Süper Lig win over Denizlispor on 25 June 2020. He joined Altındağspor in the TFF Third League on loan at the beginning of the 2020-21 season. He returned to Ankaragücü in January 2021, rejoining their youth sides. He again went on loan on 4 January 2022 joining Iğdır. He returned to Ankaragücü once more in the summer of 2022 as they were newly promoted to the Süper Lig.

References

External links
 
 
 

Living people
2001 births
People from Altındağ, Ankara
Turkish footballers
Association football forwards
MKE Ankaragücü footballers
Süper Lig players
TFF Third League players